Miloslav Mečíř was the defending champion but did not compete that year.

Boris Becker won in the final 6–4, 1–6, 7–5, 6–2 against Stefan Edberg.

Seeds
A champion seed is indicated in bold text while text in italics indicates the round in which that seed was eliminated.

  Boris Becker (champion)
  Stefan Edberg (final)
  Yannick Noah (semifinals)
  Pat Cash (quarterfinals)

Draw

External links
1988 WCT Finals Draw

Singles